Cheer Up is a South Korean television series starring Han Ji-hyun, Bae In-hyuk, Kim Hyun-jin, Jang Gyu-ri, Lee Eun-saem, and Yang Dong-geun. It premiered on SBS TV on October 3, 2022, and aired every Monday and Tuesday at 22:00 (KST).

Synopsis
A mystery campus romance set in the backdrop of a cheering squad where eating and living is useless in the moment, but splendid and precious romance is.

Cast

Main
 Han Ji-hyun as Do Hae-yi
 Park Min-ha as young Do Hae-yi
Member of Yeonhee University Cheerleader Club and a student of the theology department.
 Bae In-hyuk as Park Jung-woo
President of Yeonhee University Cheerleader Club.
 Kim Hyun-jin as Jin Sun-ho
Member of Yeonhee University Cheerleader Club and is a medical student at Yeonhee University College of Medicine.
 Jang Gyu-ri as Tae Cho-hee
Vice President of Yeonhee University Cheerleader Club.
 Lee Eun-saem as Joo Sun-ja
Member of Yeonhee University Cheerleader Club and is a friend of Do Hae-yi.
 Yang Dong-geun as Bae Young-woong
Alumni of Yeonhee University and is a supporter of the Yeonhee University Cheerleader Club.

Supporting

Yeonhee University cheering squad Theia
 Lee Jung-jun as Ki Woon-chan 
A member of the Yeonhee Cheer team. He is always bright and cheerful.
 Han Soo-ah as Choi So-yoon 
Member of Yeonhee University Cheerleader Club.
 Kim Shin-bi as Lim Yong-il
Member of Yeonhee University Cheerleader Club.
 Hyun Woo-seok as Kim Min-jae 
He was a cheerleader who joined the Yeonhee University cheer team despite hitting three times. Because of his cynical personality, he turned his back to the supporters.
 Park Bo-yeon as Lee Yu-min 
Park Jung-woo's first love. She had an accident two years ago that forced her to leave the club.
 Nam Joong-gyu as Jung Soo-il 
A senior at Yeonhee University and former Deputy Head of Cheer Group School. He is good at acrobatics and vocals.

Yeonhee University
 Ryu Hyun-kyung as Shin Ji-young
The deputy director of student affairs at Yeonhee University.
 Eun Hae-seong as Jae-hyuk 
Do Hae-yi's ex-boyfriend and a medical student at Yeonhee University.
 Yoo Yi-jun as President of the Broadcasting Division at Yeonhee University.
 Song Duk-ho as Song Ho-min
A broadcasting member of Yeonhee University.

Hogyeong University
 Jung Shin-hye as Lee Ha-jin 
Cheerleader at Hogyeong University.
 Han Soo-ah as Choi Ji-yoon
New member of Hogyeong University cheering squad and So-yoon's twin sister.

Do Hae-yi's family
 Jang Young-nam as Seong Chun-yang
Do Hae-yi's mother.
 Lee Min-jae as Do Jae-yi 
 Park Min-joon as young Do Jae-yi
Do Hae-yi's younger brother.

Park Jung-woo's family
 Yoon Bok-in as Jeong Seon-hye 
Park Jung-woo's mother.

Jin Seon-ho's family
 Baek Ji-won as Hwang Jin-hee 
Jin Seon-ho's mother.
 Kwon Hyuk as Jin Min-cheol
Jin Seon-ho's father.

Other 
 Byun Yoon-jung as Seong Chul-mo
Seong-cheol's mother, Do Hae-yi's tutor.

Extended
 Lee Seung-min
 Lee Jong-hyuk as Kyu-jin
 Im Ji-ho as Kim Jin-il

Special appearance
 Jang Na-ra as Na Jung-sun, a senior and the former cheerleader at Yeonhee University.

Production
The series was planned and produced by the drama department of SBS known as Studio S. The first script reading was held on August 24, 2022, at the SBS Ilsan Production Center, in the presence of the cast and production team including director Han Tae-seop and writer Cha Hae-won.

Viewership

Awards and nominations

Notes

References

External links
  
 
 

Seoul Broadcasting System television dramas
Korean-language television shows
Television series by Studio S
2022 South Korean television series debuts
2022 South Korean television series endings
South Korean romantic comedy television series
Wavve original programming